Caribou River may refer to several places:

Caribou River, Nova Scotia, a community in Canada
Caribou River (Rainy River District), a river in Ontario, Canada
Caribou River (Thunder Bay District), a river in Ontario, Canada
Caribou River (Minnesota), a river in U.S.